Out to Innovate, previously the National Organization of Gay and Lesbian Scientists and Technical Professionals (NOGLSTP), is a professional society for professionals in science, technology, mathematics, and engineering. Each year, Out to Innovate gives the Walt Westmann Award to members who made significant addition to the association.

History 
The organization was organized along the lines of earlier organizations of gay scientists in Los Angeles and the Research Triangle area of North Carolina, and arose out of a session at the 1980 American Association for the Advancement of Science (AAAS) meeting. It was formally organized in 1983 and incorporated in California in 1991.  The foundation of the organization was in response to issues such as gay scientists not being able to get visas to immigrate to the United States or security clearances to work in government laboratories, the lack of research on LGBT health issues, and loss of productivity due to the stress of stigmatization.  Much of the organization's early work related to increasing the visibility of LGBT scientists and opposing homophobia.  In the 1990s, it focused on encouraging corporations to adopt nondiscrimination policies and assisted in a 1995 Government Accounting Office report that recommended that LGBT status should not be considered a vulnerability to blackmail in security clearance investigations. In the 2000s and 2010s, awards for LGBT scientists, engineers, and STEM educators were established.

Programs and partnerships 
Out to Innovate supports regional groups and caucuses who choose to affiliate with Out to Innovate. Out to Innovate affiliates and partners with other national STEM organizations, including AAAS. Out to Innovate also organizes a mentoring network, a scholarship program for students, and a biannual career summit.

Out Astronaut Project 
In July 2019, Out to Innovate partnered with the Out Astronaut Project, a nonprofit initiative aimed at sending the first out LGBTQIA+ astronaut into space. The goal of the partnership, according to a press release from OAP, is to "provide opportunities for LGBTQ persons to become actively involved in space-related research."  The goals of OAP, beyond sending the first LGBTQIA+ astronaut into space includes providing a robust presence in STEM fields for LGBTQIA+ individuals "by highlighting the contributions of LGBTQ members currently working in science and space while providing grants to promising LGBTQ students." On September 24, 2019, the OAP announced via Facebook that they had found the winner of the first phase of their project.

Other affiliations 
Out to Innovate has a number of other partnerships and affiliations. They include: The American Association for the Advancement of Science, the National Postdoctoral Association, and the American Chemical Society.

LGBTQ+ Annual Recognition Awards
Out to Innovate recognizes an LGBTQ+ Scientist, Engineer, and Educator each year "who has made outstanding contributions to their field". In addition, they give the Walt Westman Award to recognize Out to Innovate members who have significantly advanced Out to Innovate's mission.

Awardees are:

References

External links 
 Website

Scientific societies based in the United States
LGBT organizations in the United States
Scientific organizations established in 1983
Science education
Engineering education
Mathematics education
Technology education
Organizations for LGBT science